Axinandra is a genus of plant in family Crypteroniaceae. It contains the following species:
 Axinandra alata 
 Axinandra beccariana 
 Axinandra coriacea 
 Axinandra zeylanica

References

 
Myrtales genera
Taxonomy articles created by Polbot